Bridal Veil Falls (officially Wairēinga / Bridal Veil Falls) is a plunge waterfall located along the Pakoka River in the Waikato area of New Zealand. The falls are in the  Wairēinga Scenic Reserve (created in 1884) with tawa-dominated forest.

Formation 
The water cascades over a basalt cliff, formed by volcanic activity, when an Okete Volcanics vent, on the  hill just to the north, erupted about 2 million years ago and blocked the valley.

Access and recreational activities 
Approximately 15 minutes from the nearby town of Raglan, the falls are an easy 10-minute walk through native bush, along the Pakoka River. Facilities include parking, long-drop toilets and four lookout platforms. River crossings are bridged. It is a steep descent to the falls base by 261 steps cut into a well maintained path.

400m beyond Bridal Veil car park, where Kawhia Rd becomes gravel, is the start of the 6 km Pipiwharauroa Way walking and cycling track.

Swimming and rock climbing 
 The pool should not be swum in as water quality does not meet health standards for swimming.
 Abseiling and rock climbing are not permitted due to damage to endangered plant life (the threatened spider orchid Corybas “Kaitarakihi” (Corybas aff. rivularis)).

See also
Waterfall Formation

References

External links 
1898 photograph in Auckland Weekly News
Accounts of visits in 1893, before formation of the road, and in 1900

Waterfalls of Waikato
Waikato District